Fouad Abdel Meguid El-Kheir (18 November 1921 – 8 January 2003) was an Egyptian basketball player. He competed in the men's tournament at the 1948 Summer Olympics and the 1952 Summer Olympics.

See also 
 List of FIBA AfroBasket winning head coaches

References

External links
 

1921 births
2003 deaths
Egyptian men's basketball players
Olympic basketball players of Egypt
Basketball players at the 1948 Summer Olympics
Basketball players at the 1952 Summer Olympics
Place of birth missing
1950 FIBA World Championship players